Chimonanthus praecox, also known as wintersweet and Japanese allspice, is a species of flowering plant in the genus Chimonanthus of the family Calycanthaceae, native to China.  The plant is known as làméi in Chinese. The plant is also grown in Iran, where it is called gol-e yakh or "ice flower" in Persian.

Its strongly scented pendent flowers, produced in winter (between November and March in UK,) on bare stems, have 15-21 yellow or pale green-yellow, tepals, the inner ones usually with purplish red pigments.

This plant is cultivated in gardens, producing valued flower colour in the dormant season. The cultivars C. praecox 'Grandiflorus' and C. praecox 'Luteus' have gained the Royal Horticultural Society's Award of Garden Merit.

The plant is not closely related to allspice, Pimenta dioica.

Cultural use
C. praecox is a common motif in traditional Persian poetry, literature, and music. A more modern example of C. praecox in Persian music is Kourosh Yaghmaei's Gol-e Yakh.

References

External links

Calycanthaceae
Flora of Central Asia
Flora of China